Zio Boris ("Uncle Boris" in Italian) is the title character of an Italian humorous comic strip series created  by Alfredo Castelli  as writer and  by Carlo Peroni as artist.

Background 
The comic series was ideated  by Alfredo Castelli in 1964, but eventually debuted only in 1970, in the comic magazine Horror.

In 1971 all the strips published in the magazine and about one hundred unpublished strips were collected in the volume Zio Boris, published by New Time. In 1972 the comic strips started being published by Il Corriere dei Ragazzi, with Daniele Fagarazzi replacing Peroni as artist. Later the strips were published in the newspapers Gazzetta del Popolo and Corriere d'Informazione, and in the magazines Tilt, Cucciolo and Doctor Beruscus.

The series tells the adventures of a mad scientist (Zio Boris) who assisted by strange creatures including a vampire, a werewolf and a flying skull makes insane experiments. The stories include citations from  The Addams Family and from classical 1930s horror films, as well as satirical cues based on current events.

References 

Italian comic strips
Zio Boris
Zio Boris
1970 comics debuts
Fictional mad scientists
Experimental medical treatments in fiction
Fictional scientists in comics